The following lists events that happened during 1890 in Chile.

Incumbents
President of Chile: José Manuel Balmaceda

Events

Births
1 November - Cárlos Koller

Deaths
17 November - Maximiano Errázuriz (born 1832)

References 

 
Years of the 19th century in Chile